Macbeth is a German 1913 silent film version of the William Shakespeare play Macbeth, and the fifth film adaptation of that work. Arthur Bourchier plays Macbeth, and Violet Vanbrugh Lady Macbeth. It was released on 17 November 1913 in the UK. It was distributed in the US as a five reel film, and the British announced lengths were 4200, 4500 and 4700 feet.

It was thought to be a lost film, though silentera.com states that the International Museum of Photography and Film at George Eastman Museum may have a print.

References

External links

Films based on Macbeth
Films of the German Empire
German silent feature films
Lost German films
1913 films
German black-and-white films
1913 lost films
1910s German films